Angélica Malinverno (born ) is a Brazilian female volleyball player.

She won with the Brazil national team the silver medal, in the 2015 Pan American Games.  
She participated in the 2014 FIVB Volleyball World Grand Prix.
On club level she played for Brasília Vôlei in 2014.

Clubs
  Osasco Vôlei (2005–2008)
  Praia Clube (2008–2012)
  Vôlei Amil/Campinas (2012–2014)
  Brasília Vôlei (2014–2015)
  SESI-SP (2015–2016)
  Vôlei Bauru (2016–2018)
  Brasília Vôlei (2018–2019)
  Praia Clube (2019–)

References

External links
 Profile at FIVB.org

1989 births
Living people
Brazilian women's volleyball players
Place of birth missing (living people)
Volleyball players at the 2015 Pan American Games
Pan American Games medalists in volleyball
Pan American Games silver medalists for Brazil
Middle blockers
Medalists at the 2015 Pan American Games